Narasimhan Ravikiran (born 12 February 1967) is an Indian slide instrumentalist, vocalist, composer, and orator, who created the concept of melharmony. He is the son of gottuvadhyam player Chitravina Narasimhan and the grandson of Narayan Iyengar, who was also a Carnatic musician.

Early life 
Ravikiran was born in Mysore, Karnataka. He made his first appearance at the age of two, in April and again in August 1969, in Bangalore, and was interviewed by Semmangudi Srinivasa Iyer, Pandit Ravi Shankar, M S Subbulakshmi and Flute T R Mahalingam. He also performed at the XLIII Madras Music Conference held at The Madras Music Academy in December 1969, and was awarded a scholarship from the academy. He was able to identify about 325 ragas (melodic scales) and 175 talas (rhythmic cycles) of Carnatic music. Ravi Shankar is said to have declared "If you don't believe in God, look at Ravikiran". Soon after, he was presented at leading institutions such as Shanmukhananda Fine Arts, Bombay and Tyagaraja Sabha, Coimbatore.

Following training under his father, Chitravina Narasimhan, Ravikiran debuted as a vocalist in 1972, when he was five years old, in Coimbatore. He performed at concerts in Madras, Mysore and Bangalore until he was 10. His recitals – often over two and a half hours – drew large audiences and won critical acclaim in the Indian media.

Career 
Ravikiran also established himself as a string instrumentalist at an early age. In July 1985, he set a record with a 24-hour non-stop solo concert in Chennai. He won an exemption to perform professional concerts for Indian Radio and Television (Doordarshan) at age 12 and was invited to represent his country in Festivals of India in France (1985), Switzerland (1987), Germany (1992), Brazil (2012) and countries like Poland, Czech Republic, Austria and Yugoslavia (1997). He has performed extensively in major events and venues across the world including the Chicago World Music Festival, Theatre de la Ville Paris, Europalia Festival, Belgium, Millennium Festival (UK), Rudolstadt Festival, Germany, Masters of Indian Music, Budapest, Sadlers Wells & Tate Modern (UK), Esplanade Festival (Singapore), Oji Hall (Tokyo), Harborfront Festival, Canada, Cleveland Festival & Madison Festival (USA).

From 1986–96, Ravikiran trained with the vocalist T. Brinda. He is acknowledged for reviving classical values among the youth. He has performed with other artists and presented several concerts which include pure solos, duos with kanjira/ghatam/mridangam apart from conventional recitals with multiple accompanists and collaborations with piano, keyboard, guitar and other instruments.

He resumed his appearance as vocalist from 1999 and has since presented voice concerts for organizations in and outside India including the Cleveland Festival & the Chicago World Music Festival. His vocal albums include Genius at Work.

Ravikiran has introduced several technical innovations on the chitravina.

Composer 
Ravikiran has created over 800 classical Indian and contemporary compositions. His Indian classical pieces include musical forms such as varnam, krti, javali, tillana and padam. He has created pieces in each of the 35-talas of Carnatic Music. as well as a 72-mela ragamalika geetam, a 13-part piece that spans over all the 72-parent ragas of Carnatic music in seven minutes.

He has created new ragas, including:

 Veetavanam in honour of Ludwig van Beethoven
 Mohini dedicated to Mahatma Gandhi
 Choodamani, created at age two and named after his mother
 Keshavapriya, Vaishnavi, Katyayani, Samapriya, Shivamanohari, and Andhakarini

Ravikiran has also set to music works of several azhwars, verses of Vedanta Desika, verses from ancient Tamil sangam literature, compositions of Purandara Dasa, D V Gundappa and a few contemporary composers.

In January 2016, Ravikiran composed music to 1330 tirukkural verses in 16 hours over 3 days at the International Institute of Tamil Studies, Taramani, Chennai.

Operas 
Ravikiran has also written a number of internationally staged operas:

 Lakshmi Prabhavam
 Savithri
 Vinayaka Vaibhavam
 Ramayana - Bala Kandam
 Ramayana - Yuddha Kandam
 Mahabharata (Karna Shapatam and Geetopadesham)
 The Almighty Trinity, a production composed entirely in Telugu, highlighting the harmonious interactions between Brahma, Vishnu and Shiva.
 Panchakriya
 Panchali Shapatam

Melharmony 

Ravikiran is known for his concept of melharmony, which explores Western style harmony anchored on (Eastern style) melodic rules of evolved systems such as the raga system of Indian music. Melharmony is regarded as a " a contemporary musical movement"  with an aim to unify music systems of the world by taking into cognisance the rules and aesthetics of all fused systems in any given collaboration. Ravikiran introduced this award-winning concept during his collaboration with artists of the BBC Philharmonic, at the Millennium Festival, UK in Oct 2000.

Melharmony concerts with major orchestras like Wisconsin Chamber Orchestra's have attracted audiences of 45,000 people at times. The concept has inspired critical discussion among scholars in international conferences including Society for Music Theory Conference, Boston (2005) and Melody, Harmony, Melharmony conference, Houston (2014). Melharmony shows with School Orchestras have enabled middle and high school children in the West glean insights into how harmony can be centered on sophisticated rules of melody.

Ravikiran has also melharmonically rearranged and showcased the works of the great Masters in the twin-Composer series of festivals - OVK-Bach, Tyagaraja-Mozart and Dikshitar-Beethoven since 2013.

Collaborations 
Ravikiran has created music for Western Classical Symphony Orchestras, Chamber Orchestras, String Quartets as well as Caprices for solo violins. He has collaborated with top-draw artistes of various genres such as Taj Mahal, Larry Coryell, Martin Simpson, George Brooks, Simon Phillips, Roland van Campenhout and orchestras such as BBC Philharmonic, Wisconsin Chamber Orchestra, Goettingen Quintet, Germany, Apollo Chamber Players, Houston, Middleton Community Symphony Orchestra and Sacramento Symphony.

Among Indian maestros, he has performed with Semmangudi Srinivasa Iyer, T. Brinda, Girija Devi, Pt Birju Maharaj, Dr M. Balamuralikrishna, Vishwa Mohan Bhatt, Dr N. Ramani, R. K. Srikanthan, Pt Kishan Maharaj, Nedunuri Krishnamurthy, Shashank Subramanyam Mandolin U Shrinivas and others.

Philanthropy and advocacy

Arts educator 
Ravikiran, is known for his large repertoire and for training a number of disciples around the world, many of whom are award-winning performers and teachers. His students have made contributions in other arenas.  His disciples span a cross section of vocalists, violinists as well as exponents of flute, guitar, veena, keyboard in addition to the chitravina. He has performed and written about the 18th century composer Oothukkadu Venkata Kavi.

Planet Symphony
Ravikiran initiated the Planet Symphony Global Art-Science-Social Environmental initiative to raise awareness of the precarious climate crisis. Within weeks the organisation had a global membership of over 2300 from 65 countries including prominent musicians, scientists, journalists, NGOs and citizens and students from other walks of life. A mammoth Global production, “Climatrix Symphony — Planet Anthem” was released for climate action in which hundreds of Grammy and other international award-winning exponents and students of Classical, Jazz, Carnatic, Hindustan, folk and film music collectively recorded on a dazzling array of 50 instruments and shared their concerns with world leaders through an open letter. The Planet Symphony also came up with original perspectives including Roof Greening as a means to attract and regulate rain in many regions.

Ambassador of Culture 
An active champion of culture, Ravikiran has performed extensively in both urban and rural schools & colleges across various countries. At age 20, he organised a symbolic non-stop 72-hour (which extended to almost 75 hours) concert for "world peace and prosperity" that brought together the who's who of Carnatic music. He has also presented concerts for Social Harmony to highlight the unifying powers of art.

Rural Music Education Projects 
In 2006, Ravikiran pioneered an initiative for Rural Children in India with the largest music camp of its kind for over 31,000 children in Tamil Nadu, India for the Indian Government's Sarva Shiksha Abhyan. Besides he has mentored several performers from diverse communities.

Music in Schools & Universities in USA and India 
A lobbyist for cultural renaissance in India, he was invited to provide syllabuses for Music Education in Schools in India for Grades I – VIII. In 2013, he introduced Indian music through Melharmonic creations for Middle and High School level orchestras in School Districts in USA such as Middleton & Sun Prairie, WI. A summer course on Melharmony was introduced at the Eastman School of Music in 2015, by Ravikiran and renowned American Composer-Musician Prof. Robert Morris.

He has introduced Carnatic music in several countries such as Slovakia, Croatia and Slovenia.

Ravikiran's concerts have raised substantial funds for disaster relief including Hurricane Katrina, Tsunami of 2004 as well as for educational, health and cultural initiatives.

Musicians Covid Relief Fund
Ravikiran set up the Musicians' Covid Relief Fund in 2020 to help numerous artists who were severely impacted by the pandemic. He got together Grammy and other Award winning celebrities from Indian and Western Classical, Jazz and other systems to play fundraisers to support artists in distress through concerts such as the Dikshitar-Beethoven Melharmony Festival.

Other contributions 
Some of Ravikiran's other contributions include:

 Introducing Indian music in a number of schools in India and USA
 Pioneering Twin Composer Celebrations such as Oottukkadu Venkata Kavi-J S Bach Festival and Tyagaraja-Mozart Festival in cities such as Madison and Chicago, USA
 Pioneering a vocal instrumental melodic ensemble, Vintage Virtuosos and a series of albums titled "Celestial Ragas".
 Introducing the portable, bright toned, 20-stringed slide instrument, Nava-chitravina
 Pioneering the use of teflon-slides in world music
 New perspectives on millennia old concepts such as "22 shrutis"
 Dance augmentation for instrumental concerts with dancer Smitha Madhav
 Introducing Tamil compositions to North Indian dance forms like Kathak & Odissi

Author 
Ravikiran has authored several sought after books on Carnatic Music including
 Appreciating Carnatic Music
 Perfecting Carnatic Music Level I and II
 Life and Contributions of Oottukkadu Venkata Kavi
 Saptaratnas and Navavaranams of Oottukkadu Venkata Kavi
 Inaiyatra innishai (The incomparable music)

He has also penned a number of articles in leading Journals and Dailies.

Awards 
International
 The Millenium Festival Award, UK - 2000
 The New Age Voice Finalist Award, USA - 2001

National & State:
 Kalaimamani (Tamil Nadu State Award) – 1985
 Star of India (Wisdom International) – 1985
 Kumar Gandharva Samman (Madhya Pradesh State Award) – 1996

Artistic
 Nada Sudharnava – 1980
 Sangeeta Choodamani, Krishna Gana Sabha
 Vadya Ratnakara - Austin India Fine Arts
 Isai Peroli - Kartik Fine Arts
 Nada Sudharnava – 1980
 Sangeeta Kala Sarathy, Dec 2013 (Parthasarathy Swami Sabha), Chennai
 Lifetime Achievement Award, Dayananda Ashram, India
 Chitravina Kala Praveena, Federation of Sabhas, Chennai
 Sangeetha Kalanidhi, The Music Academy, Madras, 2017

Sexual harassment allegations 
In connection with the Me Too movement, multiple claims that Ravikiran participated in workplace harassment of his students and subordinates surfaced. Ravikiran, in an interview with the India Times and on his Facebook account, strongly denied the allegations. Following these allegations, the Madras Music Academy dropped his concerts in the December Season 2018 music festival, along with six other musicians also accused. The Deccan Chronicle reported that a committee constituted by the Federation of City Sabhas in October 2018 did not receive complaints of sexual harassment from any performing artists. Ravikiran asserted that he has a "clean track record" and "substantial proof" of his innocence.

References

External links 

 Ravikiran's Official Website
 Website on Melharmony

1967 births
Living people
Chitravina players
Carnatic composers
Male Carnatic singers
Carnatic singers
Musicians from Mysore
20th-century Indian composers
21st-century Indian composers
20th-century Indian male classical singers
21st-century Indian male classical singers
Recipients of the Sangeet Natak Akademi Award